Mahmoud Gaber (born 17 September 1960) is an Egyptian football manager.

References

1960 births
Living people
Egyptian footballers
Ismaily SC players
Egyptian football managers
Ismaily SC managers
Al-Ahli SC (Tripoli) managers
Umm Salal SC managers
Egyptian expatriate football managers
Expatriate football managers in Libya
Egyptian expatriate sportspeople in Libya
Expatriate football managers in Bahrain
Egyptian expatriate sportspeople in Bahrain
Expatriate football managers in Saudi Arabia
Egyptian expatriate sportspeople in Saudi Arabia
Egyptian Premier League managers
Association footballers not categorized by position